Edward A. ('Ed') Wasserman is a professor of psychology at the University of Iowa.  His research focusses on comparing cognitive processes in human and non-human animals.  Wasserman has over 250 publications in peer reviewed academic journals.
In 2015 Wasserman was honoured by the Comparative Cognition Society for his contributions to the study of animal cognition.

Selected publications
Comparative Cognition Experimental Explorations of Animal Intelligence (with Thomas Zentall, 2006)

References

External links
 An interview with Wasserman on NPR
 Wasserman's master lecture at the 2015 Conference on Comparative Cognition

21st-century American psychologists
Animal cognition writers
University of Iowa faculty
Living people
Year of birth missing (living people)
Place of birth missing (living people)